The 2017–18 season was Stevenage's fourth consecutive season in League Two and their 42nd year in existence. Along with competing in League Two, the club also participated in the FA Cup, EFL Cup and EFL Trophy.

The season covers the period from 1 July 2017 to 30 June 2018.

Competitions

Friendlies
On 19 May 2017, Stevenage announced their first two friendlies for pre-season. Four days later, a third home pre-season match, against Millwall was confirmed. Six further pre-season fixtures were revealed two days later.

On 20 July 2017, it was announced the planned friendly against Cheshunt had been cancelled.

League Two

League table

Result summary

Results by matchday

Matches
On 21 June 2017, the league fixtures were announced.

FA Cup
On 16 October 2017, Stevenage were drawn at home against Nantwich Town in the first round. Another home tie against Swindon Town was confirmed for the second round. A third home tie was announced for the third round, with Championship side Reading the visitors.

EFL Cup
On 16 June 2017, Stevenage were drawn away to Millwall in the first round.

EFL Trophy
On 12 July 2017, Stevenage were drawn in Southern Group G alongside Brighton & Hove Albion U23s, Milton Keynes Dons and Oxford United.

Transfers

Transfers in

Transfers out

Loans in

Loans out

References

Stevenage
Stevenage F.C. seasons